Chris Payne Gilbert is an  American actor. He is best known for his television role as Todd on the TBS sitcom 10 Items or Less (2006–2009).

He also appeared in episodes of television series Dexter, Burn Notice, Moonlight, Shark, Bones, The Shield, Friends, CSI: Miami, Sex and the City and Charmed. His roles in a feature film include The Broken Hearts Club, Story of a Bad Boy,  Saving Manhattan, The Irish Vampire Goes West and Life Blood. In 2011, he was cast as Davey Sheppard on the Lifetime drama series The Protector (2011). In 2012 he guest starred on Criminal Minds and Fairly Legal. He also portrayed protagonist Alex Mason in Call of Duty: Black Ops Cold War.

Personal life
Gilbert married his girlfriend Lesley Ann Brandt in 2015, after being in a relationship for six years.  He and Brandt welcomed their first child, a son, Kingston Payne Brandt-Gilbert, in July 2017.

References

External links
 
 

Living people
American male film actors
American male television actors
Place of birth missing (living people)
1972 births